Kārte Parwān is a neighborhood in north-western Kabul, Afghanistan, and home to the Sikh Gurdwara Karte Parwan, Sheerno Junior High, Hotel Inter-Continental Kabul and the Bagh-e Bala Palace. The area used to be the center of the Afghan Hindu and Afghan Sikh communities. It is located 3 to 5 km away from downtown Kabul, and the Salang Watt road passes through part of it. The area is noted for having several high-profile mansions. Most of its residents are ethnic Tajiks.

The Pakistani embassy in Kabul is also situated in this neighborhood.

Notable people
Abdullah Abdullah, the former Chief Executive and Minister of Foreign Affairs of Afghanistan, is said to have been born in a house in this neighborhood and still resides in the same house.
al-Qaeda militants, Saif al-Adel and Abu Faraj al-Libbi, and associated members of the Khadr family are reported to have lived in the area in and around the year 2000.

References

Neighborhoods of Kabul
Sikhism in Kabul
Hinduism in Kabul